Rysanek is a surname. Notable people with the surname include: 

Leonie Rysanek (1926–1998), Austrian dramatic soprano
Lotte Rysanek (1924–2016), Austrian operatic soprano, sister of Leonie